United Nations Security Council Resolution 1764 was unanimously adopted on 29 June 2007.

See also 
List of United Nations Security Council Resolutions 1701 to 1800 (2006–2008)

References

External links
 
Text of the Resolution at undocs.org

 1764
 1764
2007 in Bosnia and Herzegovina
June 2007 events